Ottelia acuminata, is a plant species endemic to Southern China.

Description
The whole plant is underwater, except for the showy three-petaled flowers with lobes.
Varieties
 Ottelia acuminata var. acuminata - Guangdong, Guangxi, Guizhou, Hainan, Sichuan, Yunnan.
 Ottelia acuminata var. crispa (Hand.-Mazz.) H. Li - Yunnan (Lugu Hu).
 Ottelia acuminata var. jingxiensis H. Q. Wang & S. C. Sun - Guangxi (Jingxi).
 Ottelia acuminata var. lunanensis H. Li - Yunnan (Lugu Hu).

References

acuminata
Flora of Asia